Linda Fry Kenzle (born May 1960) is an American author, jewelry designer, painter and garden designer.

Biography

Kenzle grew up in Wisconsin, surrounded by nature. In addition to studying art at college she developed a wide variety of interests, including her self-taught passion for gardening and beadwork. She has designed jewelry valued at several thousand dollars in price.

Kenzle has done two major studies. The first explored the psychological and social functions of dress. The second focused on the history of beadwork from prehistoric times to today.

She is the author of ten books: five on art, four on gardening, and a multimedia anthology.

Kenzle is a painter of Abstract and Surrealistic Paintings.

Gardening 
She has done landscape design for the Kappas Estate, Casa del Sueños, Boardmans, etc. She specializes in layering shrubs and perennials with occasional accents of annuals to create the all-season garden.

She is an expert in propagation and has taught and cloned botanicals.  She is especially known for herbs.

Publications 
Art Dolls, 1985, Geneva Street Press
Herbs, 1990, Third Coast Book Company
Scented Geraniums, 1991, Eastlake Unlimited
Vines For America, 1992, Eastlake Unlimited
Embellishments: Adding Glamor to Garments, 1993, Chilton Book Company 
Dazzle: Creating Artistic Jewelry & Distinctive Accessories, 1995, Chilton Book Company 
The Irresistible Bead, 1996, Hyperion
Gathering: Using Simple Materials Gleaned From the Garden & Nature, 1998, KPBooks 
Pages: Innovative Book Making Techniques, 1998, Krause Publications 
Hit or Miss, 34 Autobiographical Paintings in hand-tipped plates, 2008, ICON Productions
The Primal Abstracts, 50 hand-tipped plates, 2008, ICON Productions
The Primal Abstract, 51+ hand-tipped color plates, 2009
Eat Me, 2009
Real/ Surreal, 2014
Hit or Miss, 33+ hand-tipped color plates, 2014
Greetings from the Florida Keys, 2014
ARMOR: Breastplates & Masks, 2014
Exquisite Decay, 2014
Collage & Assemblage, 2014
Love Letters to My Dying Husband, 2014

Notes

External links
 Linda Fry on AbsoluteArts.com

1960 births
Living people
American women painters
Painters from Wisconsin
Writers from Wisconsin
American jewelry designers
21st-century American women artists
Women jewellers